Charles Monroe Oberly III (born November 9, 1946) is an American attorney from Delaware. He had served as United States Attorney for the District of Delaware from 2010 to 2017 and had served as Attorney General of Delaware from 1983 to 1995.

Early life and education
Oberly was born in 1946 in Wilmington, Delaware. He earned an associate's degree from Wesley College in 1966. Oberly then received a Bachelor of Arts from Pennsylvania State University in 1968 and a Juris Doctor from University of Virginia School of Law in 1971.

Career
Oberly was the Democratic Party's nominee in the 1994 Delaware Senate election. He was defeated by the incumbent Senator, Republican William Roth. Oberly's unsuccessful Senate campaign was managed by Delaware native David Plouffe, who would go on to manage Barack Obama's 2008 presidential campaign. In 1995, he and Kathy Jennings opened their own law firm.

On September 16, 2010, President Barack Obama nominated Oberly to serve as United States Attorney for the District of Delaware. He was confirmed by the United States Senate on December 10, 2010.

See also
 2017 dismissal of U.S. attorneys

References

|-

|-

 

1946 births
Living people
People from Wilmington, Delaware
Wesley College (Delaware) alumni
Pennsylvania State University alumni
University of Virginia School of Law alumni
Delaware lawyers
Delaware Attorneys General
United States Attorneys for the District of Delaware
Delaware Democrats